In perfumery, a flanker refers to newly created perfume that shares some attributes of an already existing perfume.  These attributes may be the name, packaging or notes of the existing fragrance.

Examples
 Dior's 1985 fragrance Poison was followed by Tendre Poison (1994), Hypnotic Poison (1998), Pure Poison (2004), Midnight Poison (2007) and Poison Girl (2016).
 Issey Miyake's 1992 fragrance "L'eau d'Issey" was followed by "L'Eau d'Issey Florale" in 2011.
 The Jimmy Choo fragrance "Jimmy Choo" released in 2011 was supplemented by a flanker perfume "Exotic" released in 2013.
 Paco Rabanne's highly successful 2008 perfume for men "1 Million" was followed by a perfume for women "Lady Million" in 2010.  Its packaging was very similar to the original fragrance.

References

Perfumery